Nawab Viqar-ul-Mulk (born Mushtaq Hussain Zuberi; 24 March 1841 – 27 January 1917) was an Indian Muslim politician and one of the founders of All India Muslim League. Nawab Mushtaq Hussain or Nawab Viqar Ul Mulk was also the maternal uncle of Sir Ziauddin Ahmed, a mathematician and pillar of the  Aligarh Movement.

Early life and career

Mushtaq Hussain Kamboh's social welfare work in Moradabad, India's  famine-affected areas was noticed by the Muslim leader Sir Syed Ahmad Khan in 1861.

In 1866, at age 25, Mushtaq Hussain started his political career as a worker of the Aligarh Movement and, in this connection, became a member of its wing- Scientific Society. Later for the Scientific Society, he translated a book, 'French Revolution and Napoleon'.

He served as a Law Secretary in the Government of Hyderabad State, Deccan for some time and then joined Revenue Department with the orders of Nizam of Hyderabad. He served as Secretary, Personal Secretary and advisor to the Prime Minister Nawab Bashiral Daulla and eventually, he became Deputy Prime Minister of Hyderabad State.

On 9 December 1890, he was conferred the title of Nawab Viqar-ul-Mulk. In October 1892, Nawab Viqar-ul-Mulk joined M.A.O. college in Aligarh, Uttar Pradesh. He was a great admirer of Sir Syed Ahmed Khan. He was one of the most ardent followers of Sir Syed and a very active worker of his camp. When the 'College Fund Committee' was formed, he became one of its members and worked ceaselessly for popularizing the movement of Sir Syed. He raised a huge amount of money per the standards of that time, Rupees 750,000 for the establishment of the M. A. O. College. In 1907, he was appointed Honorary Secretary of M.A.O. College.

Founding Father of All India Muslim League
Nawab Viqar-ul-Mulk was one of the founders of the All-India Muslim League. In December 1906, the quartet Nawab Viqar-ul-Mulk, Sir Aga Khan III, and Nawab Salimullah Khan of Dhaka organised an All India Muhammadan Educational Conference in Dacca and on the same occasion, they also launched a new party called All-India Muslim League of which Nawab Viqar-ul-Mulk became General Secretary. Thus he was the founding father of Muslim League and later of the new country called Pakistan in 1947. He presided over the inaugural session of Muslim League. No doubt, he played a key role in shaping far-reaching political developments in British India.

Title of "Nawab"
He served the Hyderabad State under the British for 17 years.

In 1908, as a result of his meritorious services, the British Government of India honored him with the title of Nawab. While the Nizam of Hyderabad honored him with the title of Waqar-ud-Dola Waqar-ul-Mulk Intisar-e-Jang. His birth name was Mushtaq Hussain Zuberi, and he belonged to the well-known Kamboh alias Zuberi Family of Amroha, Marehra, and Meerut. Back in 1870, Viqar-ul-Mulk had been awarded a prize in an essay competition arranged by the 'Society for the Promotion of Education among Muslims'.

Death and legacy
Due to his bad health, Nawab Viqar-ul-Mulk gave up being the Secretary of Aligarh University in 1912. He was paralyzed by a stroke by 1915, and after a prolonged illness, he died on 27 January 1917 at age 75. He was buried in his family graveyard at Amroha, Uttar Pradesh.

It was widely considered among his contemporaries that Viqar-ul-Mulk (Mushtaq Hussain Zuberi) was a very stern, uncompromising person not often given to humor. It was also said by people that knew him that he commanded respect and fear rather than affection. Yet he was able to make a place for himself in the history of Aligarh movement as Sir Syed Ahmad Khan's close confidante and was ranked closely behind him in shaping far-reaching political and educational developments for the Muslims of British India.

Pakistan Postal Services issued a commemorative postage stamp in his honor in its 'Pioneers of Freedom' series in 1994.

See also
 Aligarh Movement
 Pakistan Movement

References

1841 births
1917 deaths
People from Meerut
People from British India
Leaders of the Pakistan Movement
All India Muslim League members
People from Hyderabad State
Founders of Indian schools and colleges
Academic staff of Aligarh Muslim University
19th-century Indian politicians
19th-century Indian Muslims
19th-century Indian educators
20th-century Indian politicians
20th-century Indian Muslims
20th-century Indian educators